U.S. Route 189 is a spur of U.S. Route 89.  It currently runs for 322 miles (518 km) from Provo, Utah at Interstate 15 to Jackson, Wyoming. The highway was not part of the original 1926 U.S. Highway system. The highway was created in the 1930s, absorbing former U.S. Route 530 and a portion of U.S. Route 30S. The portion through Provo Canyon (between Provo and Heber City, Utah) has been designated the Provo Canyon Scenic Byway by the state of Utah.

Route description

Utah

US-189 begins in Provo where it is known as University Avenue, referring to Brigham Young University.  The highway then winds up Provo Canyon passing by Deer Creek Reservoir and paralleling the route of the Heber Creeper (now known as the Heber Valley Railroad). The portion in Provo Canyon is designated the Provo Canyon Scenic Byway by the state legislature. The highway exits Provo Canyon near Heber City, Utah.

At Heber City US-189 meets U.S. Route 40 and is co-signed with Route 40 all the way to its junction with I-80.

Prior to the construction of the Jordanelle Reservoir, the highway continued north concurrent with the former alignment of US-40 that is now under water. US-40 and 189 separated at Hailstone, also now under the lake.  US-189 emerged from the lake shore along the route now signed State Route 32. SR-32 and former US-189 join I-80 in Wanship. Prior to the completion of Interstate 80 in eastern Utah US-189 formed the main streets of Coalville and other communities now bypassed by I-80.

The Utah section of US-189 is defined in Utah Code Annotated § 72-4-124(2).  The Utah Code does not contain the concurrent alignment along US-40 and I-80, but the concurrent portion is included in Utah Department of Transportation maps of the area.

Wyoming
US 189 enters Wyoming from the west co-routed with Interstate 80. The routes separate east of Evanston, at exit 18, where US 189 proceeds north through the town of Kemmerer, home of the JC Penney Mother Store which is located along the route. US 189 continues north, eventually following the western shore of Fontenelle Reservoir and passing Names Hill before entering La Barge, passing what is left of the Moondance Diner, which was moved to the town from New York City in 2007, and is famous from many movies and television shows. The route then continues north along the Green River towards the neighboring towns of Big Piney and Marbleton. This area is heavily developed by the Oil and Natural Gas industries. The route then cuts across the northern part of the Green River Basin through the town of Daniel and intersects with US 191 at Daniel Junction and runs concurrently to the north. Continuing north, the road traverses increasingly mountainous terrain, entering the Bridger-Teton National Forest and passing through the small community of Bondurant before descending through the narrow Hoback River Canyon to an intersection with US 26 and rejoining its parents route, US 89 at Hoback Junction.

History

There was a US-189 in the initial 1926 plan for U.S. Highways, which ran from Nephi to Pigeon Hollow Junction. This route is currently the eastern half of State Route 132.

In 1938, a second iteration of US 189 was created using several state routes. The portion from Provo to Heber City in Utah was numbered State Route 7. Although signed US-189 starting in 1938 this road retained the SR-7 designation until 1977.

US-189 replaced US-530, designated in 1926, between the modern junctions of I-80 with US-40 at Silver Creek Junction and I-84 at Echo. Between Echo and Evanston, Wyoming US-189 was originally concurrent with US-30S. As portions of I-80 were complete, US-189 was moved from the old US-30S alignment to the freeway alignment.

Prior to the construction of the Jordanelle Reservoir, the US-189 designation alternated between two routes between Hailstone and Wanship. For most of this era, US-189 was routed along what is now State Route 32 via Kamas. However, there are some years the official Utah Highway Map shows the road through Kamas designated as US-189 Alternate, with the main route of US-189 concurrent with the routes of US-40 and what is now I-80.

In 1985 the Utah Department of Transportation (UDOT) began plans to relocate US-40 and US-189 to prepare for the construction of the Jordanelle Reservoir.  As late as 1989, UDOT still intended move US-189 to an alignment on the northern shore of the proposed reservoir. On January 18, 1990 the Federal Highway Administration sent a letter to UDOT recommending that US-189 not be moved to this new alignment. The stated reason was this new routing would result in traveling  "out-of-direction". AASHTO agreed, and authorized a change of plan for the route of US-189 to run concurrent with US-40. UDOT agreed, and this new road was instead signed as extension of State Route 248. The portion of the former route of US-189 not submerged by the new lake was designated State Route 32 after months of negotiations with county officials.

However, although US-189 was now officially concurrent with US-40 between Heber City and Silver Creek Junction, this segment was signed only as US-40, and an "END US-189" sign was posted in Heber City. This lasted until late 2017, when the end signs were removed and US-189 signs were added to the US-40 concurrency. US-189 remains unsigned on the I-80 concurrency between Silver Creek Junction and the Wyoming state line.

Major intersections

References

External links

 Endpoints of U.S. Highway 189
 Endpoints of historic U.S. Highway 530

 
89-1
89-1
89-1
189
1
Transportation in Utah County, Utah
Transportation in Wasatch County, Utah
Transportation in Summit County, Utah
Transportation in Uinta County, Wyoming
Transportation in Lincoln County, Wyoming
Transportation in Sublette County, Wyoming
Transportation in Teton County, Wyoming